Grant Watts (born 5 November 1973) is an English retired professional footballer who played as a forward.

Playing career
Watts began his youth career with Crystal Palace and signed professional terms in August 1992. He made his senior debut on 16 December 1992 scoring in a 2–1 home win over Liverpool in the League Cup. His League debut followed three days later and he went on to make four league appearances that season and three more in the League Cup. However, after suffering a broken leg he joined Colchester United on loan and then Gillingham. After leaving Gillingham, Watts played non-league football for Sutton United, Welling United, Banstead Athletic, Egham Town, Croydon and Bromley.

Watts is now a coach at Holmesdale.

References

External links

Grant Watts at holmesdale.net

Since 1888... The Searchable Premiership and Football League Player Database (subscription required)

1973 births
Living people
English footballers
Association football forwards
Premier League players
English Football League players
Crystal Palace F.C. players
Colchester United F.C. players
Gillingham F.C. players
Sutton United F.C. players
Welling United F.C. players
Banstead Athletic F.C. players
Bromley F.C. players
Croydon F.C. players
Egham Town F.C. players